Roger Robinson (May 2, 1940 – September 26, 2018) was  an American actor who won the Tony Award for Best Performance by a Featured Actor in a Play for the 2009 revival of Joe Turner's Come and Gone.

Life and career
Born in Seattle, Washington, Robinson made his Broadway debut in 1969 in Does a Tiger Wear a Necktie? opposite Al Pacino. Additional theatre credits include Amen Corner, The Iceman Cometh, and Seven Guitars, which garnered him his first Tony nomination.

Robinson appeared in six of August Wilson's ten plays chronicling African-American life in the 20th century. He felt the playwright's "use of language is second to none, except Eugene O'Neill and perhaps Tennessee Williams." Robinson was the first African American to receive the Richard Seff Award, presented annually by the Actors' Equity Foundation to an actor fifty years of age or older for his performance in a supporting role in a Broadway or off-Broadway production.

Robinson's film credits include Believe in Me (1971), Willie Dynamite (1974), Newman's Law (1974), Meteor (1979), It's My Turn (1980), The Lonely Guy (1984), Who's the Man? (1993), Wedding Daze (2006), and Brother to Brother (2004). The latter won him the LA Outfest Grand Jury Award Outstanding Actor in a Feature Film and a nomination for the Independent Spirit Award for Best Supporting Male.

Robinson's television credits include the television miniseries King, TV-movie The Marcus-Nelson Murders, which led to a recurring role on Kojak, a regular role on the short-lived Mary Stuart Masterson series Kate Brasher, and guest appearances on Ironside, Starsky and Hutch, The Jeffersons, A Man Called Hawk, Law & Order, New York Undercover, Homicide: Life on the Street, ER, Kojak, and NYPD Blue. On ABC's How to Get Away With Murder, he played Mac Harkness, the father of Viola Davis' Annalise Keating. He also wrote material for Martin Lawrence Presents: 1st Amendment Stand-Up.

Filmography

References

External links

Playbill.com interview, June 2, 2009

1940 births
2018 deaths
American male stage actors
American male film actors
American male television actors
African-American male actors
Tony Award winners
Male actors from Seattle
20th-century African-American people
21st-century African-American people